Tampines is the regional centre of the East Region of Singapore. With a population of 265,340 living across its five subzones, it is the second-most populous planning area in Singapore, according to the DOS Population Trends 2022. It is home to approximately 5% of Singapore's population. Tampines is bordered to the west by Bedok and Paya Lebar, to the north by Pasir Ris, to the east by Changi, and to the south by the Straits of Singapore. Situated in the historical region of Tanah Merah, its present-day terrain is particularly flat due to the large-scale sand quarrying in the 1960s.

Tampines is composed of five subzones — Tampines North, Tampines East, Tampines West, Simei and Xilin. These subzones were created in the early 1990s predominantly for urban planning purposes and have no relation to the three political constituencies in Tampines. Four of its subzones are largely residential with the exception of Xilin, which has a fair mix of commercial, industrial and recreational facilities. Xilin is home to Singapore Expo, the largest convention center in Singapore, and features the largest agglomeration of golf courses in Singapore.

As the first regional centre in Singapore, Tampines has progressed from a remote neighbourhood in the 1980s to a vibrant commercial hub. It is one of three regional centres in the city-state, serving to decentralise economic activity from the Central Business District to other parts of the island, an idea first proposed in the 1991 Concept Plan. Several large insurance companies, real estate corporations and financial institutions, such as OCBC and UOB, have shifted their back-end operations to the regional centre. According to the Urban Redevelopment Authority, it now has 200,000 m² of office space and 112,000 m² of retail space. Tampines is also home to Changi Business Park, Singapore’s largest integrated business park. It is a 71,000 m² project that houses many multinational corporations, including J.P. Morgan, Credit Suisse, IBM and Standard Chartered. As of 2016, it has 152,400 resident working persons, the second-highest in Singapore, according to the Department of Statistics.

Tampines New Town in the north is a densely-populated residential town, and regarded as the core of the planning area. Its boundaries, as delineated by the Housing Development Board, exclude Xilin and the private housing estates of Simei. It spans 1200 hectares, of which 549 hectares is residential area, the largest of any town in Singapore. It is currently the third-most populous town in Singapore, with 232,700 residents (as of 2018). Amidst rapid ongoing development in Tampines North and with a projected ultimate of 110,000 dwelling units, Tampines is expected to become the most populous town in Singapore in the near future. Regarded as a mature estate by the Government, it is the first estate in Singapore to employ its own municipal services office, given the variety of municipal issues it has to handle. Enforcement of certain minor infractions has also been delegated to Tampines Municipal Services through its enforcement officers.

Etymology 
The name Tampines goes back to the Franklin and Jackson map of 1828. It is named after Sungei Tampines, which in turn got its name from the tempinis trees (Malay for Streblus elongatus) which were said to be growing by it.

History

In the past, Tampines was covered by forests, swamp, and sand quarries. Ironwood trees, or tempinis in Malay, grew abundantly. The area was part of a military training area until about 1987.

The oldest street in the area, Tampines Road, dates to 1864 when it was a cart track. At the turn of the 20th century, Tampines was a rubber plantation. Tampines was also home to the sand quarry for a long time. Among the plantations were Teo Tek Ho and Hun Yeang estates.

The new town started in 1978. Construction began for Neighbourhoods 1 and 2 and was completed between 1983 and 1987, although they were given priority. Neighbourhoods 8 and 9 began in 1985–1989, followed by Neighbourhood 5, which was completed in 1989 with the Tampines Town Centre. Neighbourhood 4 was completed with the new Tampines North Division between 1986 and 1988. Tampines Town was at the fast-paced expansion that breaks it into Tampines East, Tampines West, Tampines North, and Tampines Changkat divisions.

For the Singapore MRT plans, they showed "Tampines North" and "Tampines South" since the planning stages, which is due to the similar townships from 1979 to 1982, before they were renamed respectively in 1985 to Tampines and Simei.

New construction methods expedited the development of the town's infrastructure. More attractive designs, colours, and finishings were incorporated into Tampines than earlier public housing, which consisted of uniform slabs of concrete laid out row after row with more thought given to function than form. The Town Centre was planned as an hourglass shape to create a unique urban design form. The Housing and Development Board (HDB) managed the construction of the town until 1991, when it handed the reins over to the Tampines Town Council. The Town Council is run by grassroot leaders and the residents themselves.

The Building and Social Housing Foundation (BSHF) of the United Nations awarded the World Habitat Award to Tampines, which was selected as a representative of Singapore's new towns, on 5 October 1992. The award was given to recognise an outstanding contribution towards human settlement and development.

Neighbourhoods 3 and 7 were only fully completed in 1997, and the constituencies had been reformed to include the new Tampines Central division. Construction was paused until the developments of Tampines Central were started in 2010, which consists of The Premiere @ Tampines, Tampines GreenLeaf, Centrale 8, Tampines Trilliant, and Citylife @ Tampines, including some of the other leftover pockets of residential developments such as Tampines GreenTerrace, Arc @ Tampines, Q Bay Residences and The Santorini.

Neighbourhood 6, which is also known as Tampines North New Town, has started construction with the first Build-To-Order (BTO) flats Tampines GreenRidges being announced at the end of November 2014. Tampines GreenRidges is also part of the first phase of the Tampines North New Town's Park West District, which is the first district to be constructed in the Tampines North New Town development.

Tampines Court, had been en-bloc since July 2017 and all residents vacated their premises by 12 December 2018. It is a former HUDC flat that was privatised in 2002. The upcoming condominium is Treasure at Tampines.

Amenities
Tampines, which includes Tampines North and Simei is home to over 237,800 residents living in 152,000 HDB flats spread out over 20.89 square kilometres:

Tampines North
Tampines East
Tampines Changkat
Tampines Central
Tampines West
Simei
Others (Mainly commercial and industrial parks, with no nearby residential areas)
Tampines Retail Park
Tampines Industrial Park A
Tampines LogisPark
Tampines Wafer Fab Park
Tampines Hi-Tech Park
Tampines Advance Display Park
Changi Business Park
Changi South Business Park
Singapore Expo

Tampines Regional Centre
The urban planning policy of Singapore is to create partially self-sufficient towns, in terms of commercial needs, to relieve strain on traffic drawn to the city centre. Thus, an array of facilities are provided primarily for residents in the new towns. Tampines is one of Singapore's four regional centres (along with Woodlands, Jurong East and future Seletar), under the plan of the Urban Redevelopment Authority. As a result, the Tampines Regional Centre serves the Tampines residents and the entire East Region.

Commercial services

Retail shopping in the Tampines Regional Centre is done at four main shopping malls — Tampines Mall, Century Square, Tampines 1 and Our Tampines Hub. Commercial tenants of the shopping centres include restaurants, supermarkets, department stores, cinemas, bookstores, international money remittance and gift shops.

There are other malls outside the New Town as well, namely Eastpoint Mall, Singapore Expo, and Changi City Point.

On 30 November 2006, IKEA opened its second outlet and first megastore in Singapore at Tampines Retail Park, adjacent to Courts and Giant, together, these three are the first to have retail warehouse stores in Singapore. On 9 April 2009, UNIQLO opened its first outlet in Southeast Asia at Tampines 1.

There are three hotels in Tampines — Dusit Thani Laguna Singapore, Park Avenue Changi and capri by Fraser. Catered to business travellers, they are all located in and around Changi Business Park.

Community services

The Tampines Regional Library was located at Tampines Central and has now moved its facilities to the Our Tampines Hub.

Parks
The three main parks in the Tampines Town are Sunplaza Park, at Tampines Avenue 7 and 9; Tampines Bike Park (which officially closed on 17 September 2014, as to make way for the future developments of the future Tampines North New Town.), at the junction of Tampines 9 and 7; and NParks latest nature park as of 24 April 2011, Tampines Eco Green, at the junction of Tampines 12 and 9. All of the parks are close to each other and interconnected by a walking and bicycle path.

The other parks in Tampines Town are mainly community parks– Tampines North Park, Tampines Leisure Park, Tampines Central Park, Tampines Park, Festival Park, Tampines Green, Tampines Tree Garden, and some neighbourhood parks. Occasionally, community-related events are held at Festival Park.

There's also another unofficial park in Tampines Town. It is Tampines Quarry Park, which initially was a sand quarry. As time passed, rainwater filled the quarry. It is the only park in Tampines that is not equipped with any facilities, but this park is still popular among residents living nearby. There are no signs to the park, and there is no entrance as it is hidden among the greenery. There are hidden pathways to enter.

In the future, there will be a new central park added in Tampines Town, which is called Tampines Boulevard Park, which will be located at the future Tampines North New Town. There will also be more new neighbourhood parks added in the future in both Tampines Town and Tampines North New Town and the developments in the area.

Our Tampines Hub

Our Tampines Hub is a new development in Tampines. Construction began in June 2013 and it opened on 9 November 2016. It is located at the site of the former Tampines Stadium along Avenue 4 and 5, together with the swimming pool.

It is built for the residents of Tampines and provides a community space where residents can gather, interact, and bond with others from the community. Facilities available include a community centre, sports and recreation centres, swimming pools, bowling alleys, karaoke facilities, information centres, and several offices. The Tampines Regional Library was also relocated here.

Politics
Originally, Tampines was under the Tampines Single Member Constituency when it was still under development up until 1988, where its population was grown and became the Tampines Group Representation Constituency (GRC) & Eunos GRC.

The Workers' Party had contested parts of the town in Tampines North, which was part of Eunos GRC, in 1988 and 1991 respectively. In both elections, WP lost with 49.11% and 47.62% of the votes respectively 

The National Solidarity Party (and later Singapore Democratic Alliance in the 2001 and 2006 elections) had contested in the town in all the general elections except in 1997, when the party was disqualified. 

The GRC was eventually dissolved, and the ward of Tampines North, split and absorbed into Pasir Ris Group Representation Constituency and Tampines GRC, with the rest of the former being absorbed back to Tampines in 2001.

Since 2020, Tampines was divided into three Group Representation Constituencies, namely the namesake Tampines (central and regional centre), Aljunied (Bedok Reservoir and Temasek Polytechnic) and East Coast (the subregion of Simei). Tampines was led by the PAP, among which the MPs include Minister of the Environment and Water Resources and Muslim Affairs Masagos Zulkifli, except for Aljunied being led by the Workers' Party of Singapore.

From 2011 to 2020, Deputy Prime Minister and Minister for Finance Heng Swee Keat headed the PAP team before transferring to East Coast GRC. From 2001 to 2020, part of Tampines which is under Pasir Ris-Punggol GRC were transferred back to Tampines GRC.

Transportation

Road network
A network of expressways, namely the Pan-Island Expressway, East Coast Parkway and Tampines Expressway, and arterial roads allow easy movement within the town and link it to other parts of the island. Tampines Avenue 10, an arterial street, forms the start/end of the Outer Ring Road System, a semi-expressway.

Mass rapid transit
There are currently 6 MRT stations that serve the planning area across 2 lines, the East West line and Downtown line. Both lines have two interchange stations at Tampines MRT station and Expo MRT station on the Changi Airport Branch line. The stations of the Downtown line were opened on 21 October 2017 as part of DTL3. The 6 stations are:

 Tampines
 Simei
 Tampines West
 Tampines East
 Upper Changi
 Expo
 Xilin (future)
 Tampines North (future)

Xilin MRT station is a future underground station as part of the DTL3 extension, which will be completed in 2024 in tandem with Stage 4 of the Thomson–East Coast line.

Tampines North MRT station is another station under construction in Tampines, and will be located in the Tampines North Integrated Transport Hub. It is part of the 29-kilometre Phase 1 of the Cross Island line, which will be operational from 2030.

Bus
There are three bus interchanges — Tampines Bus Interchange, Tampines North Bus Interchange and Tampines Concourse Bus Interchange. All of them are located in Tampines New Town.

Tampines Bus Interchange has been operating since 1983 as a bus terminus, and later on, it moved to Tampines Central 1 in 1987. It is the busiest bus interchange in the town. Tampines Concourse Bus Interchange opened on 18 December 2016 to increase the capacity of the existing Tampines Bus Interchange.

Tampines North Bus Interchange opened in 27 November 2022 to serve new residents in Tampines North. It will be redeveloped to be part of the Tampines North Integrated Transport Hub (ITH).

Changi Business Park Bus Terminal is a bus terminal in the northern part of Changi Business Park and was opened on 20 December 2015.

Education
The eleven primary schools, nine secondary schools, three tertiary institutions, and two international schools to provide education for Tampines residents and those living in the region. There are plans to add new schools in Tampines due to a high demand in the East Region of the city-state of Singapore.

Primary schools
 Changkat Primary School
 Chongzheng Primary School
 East Spring Primary School
 Gongshang Primary School
 Junyuan Primary School
 Saint Hilda's Primary School
 Tampines North Primary School
 Tampines Primary School
 Yumin Primary School

Tertiary institutions
 Temasek Polytechnic
 ITE College East
 Singapore University of Technology and Design

Secondary schools
 Changkat Changi Secondary School
 Dunman Secondary School
 East Spring Secondary School
 Junyuan Secondary School
 Ngee Ann Secondary School
 Pasir Ris Secondary School
 Springfield Secondary School
 Saint Hilda's Secondary School
 Tampines Secondary School

International schools
 United World College of South East Asia (East Campus)

References

Bibliography
 National Heritage Board (2002), Singapore's 100 Historic Places, Archipelago Press,

External links

Tampines Town Council

 
Places in Singapore
 East Region, Singapore